Coliban is a Romanian surname. Notable people with the surname include:

 Ion Coliban (born 1925), Romanian skier
 Sorin Coliban (born 1976), Romanian opera singer

Romanian-language surnames